Luckey is the surname of:

People
 Andy Luckey (born 1965), American television producer and author
 Bud Luckey (1934–2018), American cartoonist and animator
 Henry Carl Luckey (1868–1956), American politician
 Hugh M. Luckey (1873–1946), American farmer and politician
 Lillian Luckey (1919–2021), All-American Girls Professional Baseball League player
 Palmer Luckey (born 1992), American entrepreneur, founder of Oculus VR and designer of the Oculus Rift
 Spencer Luckey (born 1970), American sculptor and architect of children's climbing structures
 Susan Luckey (1938–2012), American actress
 Tom Luckey (1940–2012), American architect and sculptor

Fictional characters
 Dennis Luckey, on the American TV series The Leftovers

See also 
 Lucky (disambiguation)